The 1996 European Indoors was a women's tennis tournament played on indoor hard courts at the Hallenstadion in Zürich in Switzerland that was part of Tier I of the 1996 WTA Tour. The tournament was held from 14 October through 20 October 1996. Fourth-seeded Jana Novotná won the singles titles and earned $150,000 first-prize money.

Gabriela Sabatini announced her retirement shortly after losing her first-round match against Jennifer Capriati.

Finals

Singles

 Jana Novotná defeated  Martina Hingis 6–2, 6–2
 It was Novotná's 2nd title of the year and the 13th of her career.

Doubles

 Martina Hingis /  Helena Suková defeated  Nicole Arendt /  Natasha Zvereva 7–5, 6–4
 It was Hingis' 3rd title of the year and the 4th of her career. It was Suková's 4th title of the year and the 76th of her career.

References

External links
 ITF tournament edition details
 Tournament draws

Barilla Indoors
Zurich Open
1996 in Swiss tennis
1996 in Swiss women's sport